Bellmont Precinct is one of the eight precincts of Wabash County, Illinois. Bellmont, Illinois is the seat.

Precincts in Wabash County, Illinois